Garland is an unincorporated community in Butler County, Alabama, United States, located  west of McKenzie.

History
The community was named in 1831 for W. P. Garland, who was one of the chief engineers on the Mobile and Montgomery Railroad. At one time, Garland had a hotel, saw mill, drug store, shoe shop, school, and five general stores. Garland was formerly home to a Masonic lodge, Garland Lodge No. 684. A post office operated under the name Garland from 1860 to 1975.

Notable people
Earnie Shavers, former professional boxer
Hank Williams, singer-songwriter. Hank and his family lived with his maternal grandmother in Garland for a short time.

References

Unincorporated communities in Butler County, Alabama
Unincorporated communities in Alabama